The Takami class is a class of coastal minesweepers of the Japan Maritime Self-Defense Force.

Development 
The experience of minesweeping during the Korean War has made countries concerned and aware of the threat of submerged mines. In particular, the increasing intelligence of sensitive mine ignition devices and the emergence of target tracking mines will increase the risk of touching mines and the uncertainty of minesweeping in conventional towed rear minesweeping, and one mine will be removed by explosive disposal methods. Attention was focused on minesweeping, which was to ensure that one was incapacitated.

However, on the other hand, as of the early 1950s, only the earliest mine detectors such as the American AN/UQS-1 were in practical use, and these 100 kHz class sonars were to detect mine-like targets. However, it was not practical to use for mine clearance because it was not possible to distinguish whether it was actually a mine. To solve this problem, the United Kingdom, Plessey Company, in addition to the 100 kilohertz for mine detection was a two-frequency sonar that corresponds to the 300 kilohertz for mine classification ASDIC 193 type developed, the 1960s the country's Navy's Ton-class minesweeper. It was since used It in by mounting it on a minesweeper.

In Japan's Maritime Self-Defense Force, after establishing the minimum required minesweeping operational force in the 1st Defense Build-up Plan and the 2nd Defense Build-up Plan , the amount of further minesweeping capacity in the 3rd Defense Build-up Plan The aim was to improve the quality and quality. For this reason, it was decided to give the new minesweeper, which will be maintained from the 1967 plan, the same minesweeper function as the Ton-class minesweeper.

Ships in the class

Citations 

Ships built in Japan
Minesweepers of the Japan Maritime Self-Defense Force